The Akkadian Empire was the first ancient empire of Mesopotamia after the long-lived civilization of Sumer. It was centered in the city of Akkad and its surrounding region. The empire united Akkadian and Sumerian speakers under one rule. The Akkadian Empire exercised influence across Mesopotamia, the Levant, and Anatolia, sending military expeditions as far south as Dilmun and Magan (modern Saudi Arabia, Bahrain, and Oman) in the Arabian Peninsula.

The Akkadian Empire reached its political peak between the 24th and 22nd centuries BC, following the conquests by its founder Sargon of Akkad. Under Sargon and his successors, the Akkadian language was briefly imposed on neighboring conquered states such as Elam and Gutium. Akkad is sometimes regarded as the first empire in history, though the meaning of this term is not precise, and there are earlier Sumerian claimants.

History of research
The Bible refers to Akkad in Genesis 10:10–12, which states:

"The beginning of his [Nimrod's] kingdom was Babel, and Erech, and Accad, and Calneh, in the land of Shinar. Out of that land he went forth into Assyria, and built Nineveh, and Rehoboth-Ir, and Calah, and Resen between Nineveh and Calah (the same is the great city)."

Nimrod's historical identity is unknown or debated, but Nimrod has been identified as Sargon of Akkad by some, and others have compared him with the legendary Gilgamesh, king of Uruk. Today, scholars have documented some 7,000 texts from the Akkadian period, written in both Sumerian and Akkadian. Many later texts from the successor states of Assyria and Babylonia also deal with the Akkadian Empire.

Understanding of the Akkadian Empire continues to be hampered by the fact that its capital Akkad has not yet been located, despite numerous attempts. Precise dating of archaeological sites is hindered by the fact that there are no clear distinctions between artifact assemblages thought to stem from the preceding Early Dynastic period, and those thought to be Akkadian. Likewise, material that is thought to be Akkadian continues to be in use into the Ur III period.

Many of the more recent insights on the Akkadian Empire have come from excavations in the Upper Khabur area in modern northeastern Syria which was to become a part of Assyria after the fall of Akkad. For example, excavations at Tell Mozan (ancient Urkesh) brought to light a sealing of Tar'am-Agade, a previously unknown daughter of Naram-Sin, who was possibly married to an unidentified local endan (ruler). The excavators at nearby Tell Leilan (ancient Shekhna/Shubat-Enlil) have used the results from their investigations to argue that the Akkadian Empire came to an end due to a sudden drought, the so-called 4.2 kiloyear event. The impact of this climate event on Mesopotamia in general, and on the Akkadian Empire in particular, continues to be hotly debated.

Excavation at the modern site of Tell Brak has suggested that the Akkadians rebuilt a city ("Brak" or "Nagar") on this site, for use as an administrative center. The city included two large buildings including a complex with temple, offices, courtyard, and large ovens.

Dating and periodization
The Akkadian period is generally dated to 2334–2154 BC (according to the middle chronology). The short-chronology dates of 2270–2083 BC are now considered less likely. It was preceded by the Early Dynastic Period of Mesopotamia (ED) and succeeded by the Ur III Period, although both transitions are blurry. For example, it is likely that the rise of Sargon of Akkad coincided with the late ED Period and that the final Akkadian kings ruled simultaneously with the Gutian kings alongside rulers at the city-states of both Uruk and Lagash. The Akkadian Period is contemporary with EB IV (in Israel), EB IVA and EJ IV (in Syria), and EB IIIB (in Turkey).

Timeline of rulers

The relative order of Akkadian kings is clear, while noting that the Ur III version of the Sumerian King List inverts the order of Rimush and Manishtushu. The absolute dates of their reigns are approximate (as with all dates prior to the Late Bronze Age collapse c. 1200 BC).

History and development of the empire

Pre-Sargonic Akkad

The Akkadian Empire takes its name from the region and the city of Akkad, both of which were localized in the general confluence area of the Tigris and Euphrates Rivers. Although the city of Akkad has not yet been identified on the ground, it is known from various textual sources. Among these is at least one text predating the reign of Sargon. Together with the fact that the name Akkad is of non-Akkadian origin, this suggests that the city of Akkad may have already been occupied in pre-Sargonic times.

Sargon of Akkad

Sargon of Akkad defeated and captured Lugal-zage-si in the Battle of Uruk and conquered his empire. The earliest records in the Akkadian language date to the time of Sargon. Sargon was claimed to be the son of La'ibum or Itti-Bel, a humble gardener, and possibly a hierodule, or priestess to Ishtar or Inanna. One legend related to Sargon in Assyrian times says that

Later claims made on behalf of Sargon were that his mother was an "entu" priestess (high priestess). The claims might have been made to ensure a pedigree of nobility, since only a highly placed family could achieve such a position.

Originally a cupbearer (Rabshakeh) to a king of Kish with a Semitic name, Ur-Zababa, Sargon thus became a gardener, responsible for the task of clearing out irrigation canals. The royal cupbearer at this time was in fact a prominent political position, close to the king and with various high level responsibilities not suggested by the title of the position itself. This gave him access to a disciplined corps of workers, who also may have served as his first soldiers. Displacing Ur-Zababa, Sargon was crowned king, and he entered upon a career of foreign conquest. Four times he invaded Syria and Canaan, and he spent three years thoroughly subduing the countries of "the west" to unite them with Mesopotamia "into a single empire".

However, Sargon took this process further, conquering many of the surrounding regions to create an empire that reached westward as far as the Mediterranean Sea and perhaps Cyprus (Kaptara); northward as far as the mountains (a later Hittite text asserts he fought the Hattian king Nurdaggal of Burushanda, well into Anatolia); eastward over Elam; and as far south as Magan (Oman) — a region over which he reigned for purportedly 56 years, though only four "year-names" survive. He consolidated his dominion over his territories by replacing the earlier opposing rulers with noble citizens of Akkad, his native city where loyalty would thus be ensured.

Trade extended from the silver mines of Anatolia to the lapis lazuli mines in modern Afghanistan, the cedars of Lebanon and the copper of Magan. This consolidation of the city-states of Sumer and Akkad reflected the growing economic and political power of Mesopotamia. The empire's breadbasket was the rain-fed agricultural system and a chain of fortresses was built to control the imperial wheat production.

Images of Sargon were erected on the shores of the Mediterranean, in token of his victories, and cities and palaces were built at home with the spoils of the conquered lands. Elam and the northern part of Mesopotamia were also subjugated, and rebellions in Sumer were put down. Contract tablets have been found dated in the years of the campaigns against Canaan and against Sarlak, king of Gutium. He also boasted of having subjugated the "four-quarters" — the lands surrounding Akkad to the north, the south (Sumer), the east (Elam), and the west (Martu). Some of the earliest historiographic texts (ABC 19, 20) suggest he rebuilt the city of Babylon (Bab-ilu) in its new location near Akkad.

Sargon, throughout his long life, showed special deference to the Sumerian deities, particularly Inanna (Ishtar), his patroness, and Zababa, the warrior god of Kish. He called himself "The anointed priest of Anu" and "the great ensi of Enlil" and his daughter, Enheduanna, was installed as priestess to Nanna at the temple in Ur.

Troubles multiplied toward the end of his reign. A later Babylonian text states:

It refers to his campaign in "Elam", where he defeated a coalition army led by the King of Awan and forced the vanquished to become his vassals.

Also shortly after, another revolt took place:

Rimush and Manishtushu

Sargon had crushed opposition even at old age. These difficulties broke out again in the reign of his sons, where revolts broke out during the nine-year reign of Rimush (2278–2270 BC), who fought hard to retain the empire, and was successful until he was assassinated by some of his own courtiers. According to his inscriptions, he faced widespread revolts, and had to reconquer the cities of Ur, Umma, Adab, Lagash, Der, and Kazallu from rebellious ensis: Rimush introduced mass slaughter and large scale destruction of the Sumerian city-states, and maintained meticulous records of his destructions. Most of the major Sumerian cities were destroyed, and Sumerian human losses were enormous:

Rimush's elder brother, Manishtushu (2269–2255 BC) succeeded him. The latter seems to have fought a sea battle against 32 kings who had gathered against him and took control over their pre-Arab country, consisting of modern-day United Arab Emirates and Oman. Despite the success, like his brother he seems to have been assassinated in a palace conspiracy.

Naram-Sin

Manishtushu's son and successor, Naram-Sin (2254–2218 BC), due to vast military conquests, assumed the imperial title "King Naram-Sin, king of the four-quarters" (Lugal Naram-Sîn, Šar kibrat 'arbaim), the four-quarters as a reference to the entire world. He was also for the first time in Sumerian culture, addressed as "the god (Sumerian = DINGIR, Akkadian = ilu) of Agade" (Akkad), in opposition to the previous religious belief that kings were only representatives of the people towards the gods.
He also faced revolts at the start of his reign, but quickly crushed them.

Naram-Sin also recorded the Akkadian conquest of Ebla as well as Armanum and its king. The location of Armanum is debated: it is sometimes identified with a Syrian kingdom mentioned in the tablets of Ebla as Armi, whose location is also debated; while historian Adelheid Otto identifies it with the Citadel of Bazi at the Tell Banat complex on the Euphrates River between Ebla and Tell Brak, others like Wayne Horowitz identify it with Aleppo. Further, while most scholars place Armanum in Syria, Michael C. Astour believes it to be located north of the Hamrin Mountains in northern Iraq.

To better police Syria, he built a royal residence at Tell Brak, a crossroads at the heart of the Khabur River basin of the Jezirah. Naram-Sin campaigned against Magan which also revolted; Naram-Sin "marched against Magan and personally caught Mandannu, its king", where he instated garrisons to protect the main roads. The chief threat seemed to be coming from the northern Zagros Mountains, the Lulubis and the Gutians. A campaign against the Lullubi led to the carving of the "Victory Stele of Naram-Suen", now in the Louvre. Hittite sources claim Naram-Sin of Akkad even ventured into Anatolia, battling the Hittite and Hurrian kings Pamba of Hatti, Zipani of Kanesh, and 15 others.

The economy was highly planned. Grain was cleaned, and rations of grain and oil were distributed in standardized vessels made by the city's potters. Taxes were paid in produce and labour on public walls, including city walls, temples, irrigation canals and waterways, producing huge agricultural surpluses. This newfound Akkadian wealth may have been based upon benign climatic conditions, huge agricultural surpluses and the confiscation of the wealth of other peoples.

In later Assyrian and Babylonian texts, the name Akkad, together with Sumer, appears as part of the royal title, as in the Sumerian LUGAL KI-EN-GI KI-URI or Akkadian Šar māt Šumeri u Akkadi, translating to "king of Sumer and Akkad". This title was assumed by the king who seized control of Nippur, the intellectual and religious center of southern Mesopotamia.

During the Akkadian period, the Akkadian language became the lingua franca of the Middle East, and was officially used for administration, although the Sumerian language remained as a spoken and literary language. The spread of Akkadian stretched from Syria to Elam, and even the Elamite language was temporarily written in Mesopotamian cuneiform. Akkadian texts later found their way to far-off places, from Egypt (in the Amarna Period) and Anatolia, to Persia (Behistun).

Submission of Sumerian kings
The submission of some Sumerian rulers to the Akkadian Empire, is recorded in the seal inscriptions of Sumerian rulers such as Lugal-ushumgal, governor (ensi) of Lagash ("Shirpula"), circa 2230-2210 BC. Several inscriptions of Lugal-ushumgal are known, particularly seal impressions, which refer to him as governor of Lagash and at the time a vassal (arad, "servant" or "slave") of Naram-Sin, as well as his successor Shar-kali-sharri. One of these seals proclaims:

It can be considered that Lugal-ushumgal was a collaborator of the Akkadian Empire, as was Meskigal, ruler of Adab. Later however, Lugal-ushumgal was succeeded by Puzer-Mama who, as Akkadian power waned, achieved independence from Shar-Kali-Sharri, assuming the title of "King of Lagash" and starting the illustrious Second Dynasty of Lagash.

Collapse 

The empire of Akkad likely fell in the 22nd century BC, within 180 years of its founding, ushering in a "Dark Age" with no prominent imperial authority until the Third Dynasty of Ur. The region's political structure may have reverted to the status quo ante of local governance by city-states.

By the end of Sharkalisharri's reign, the empire had begun to unravel.

After several years (and 4 kings) of chaos Shu-turul and Dudu appear to have restored some centralized authority for several decades however they were unable to prevent the empire eventually collapsing outright, eventually ceding power to Gutians, based in Adab, who had been conquered by Akkad in the reign of Sharkalisharri.

Little is known about the Gutian period, or how long it endured. Cuneiform sources suggest that the Gutians' administration showed little concern for maintaining agriculture, written records, or public safety; they reputedly released all farm animals to roam about Mesopotamia freely and soon brought about famine and rocketing grain prices. The Sumerian king Ur-Nammu (2112–2095 BC) cleared the Gutians from Mesopotamia during his reign.

The Sumerian King List, describing the Akkadian Empire after the death of Shar-kali-shari, states:

However, there are no known year-names or other archaeological evidence verifying any of these later kings of Akkad or Uruk, apart from several artefact referencing king Dudu of Akkad and Shu-turul. The named kings of Uruk may have been contemporaries of the last kings of Akkad, but in any event could not have been very prominent.

The period between  BC and 2004 BC is known as the Ur III period. Documents again began to be written in Sumerian, although Sumerian was becoming a purely literary or liturgical language, much as Latin later would be in Medieval Europe.

One explanation for the end of the Akkadian empire is simply that the Akkadian dynasty could not maintain its political supremacy over other independently powerful city-states.

Drought 

One theory associates regional decline at the end of the Akkadian period (and of the First Intermediary Period following the Old Kingdom in Ancient Egypt) with rapidly increasing aridity, and failing rainfall in the region of the Ancient Near East, caused by a global centennial-scale drought. Harvey Weiss has shown that  Peter B. de Menocal has shown "there was an influence of the North Atlantic Oscillation on the streamflow of the Tigris and Euphrates at this time, which led to the collapse of the Akkadian Empire". More recent analysis of simulations from the HadCM3 climate model indicate that there was a shift to a more arid climate on a timescale that is consistent with the collapse of the empire.

Excavation at Tell Leilan suggests that this site was abandoned soon after the city's massive walls were constructed, its temple rebuilt and its grain production reorganized. The debris, dust, and sand that followed show no trace of human activity. Soil samples show fine wind-blown sand, no trace of earthworm activity, reduced rainfall and indications of a drier and windier climate. Evidence shows that skeleton-thin sheep and cattle died of drought, and up to 28,000 people abandoned the site, presumably seeking wetter areas elsewhere. Tell Brak shrank in size by 75%. Trade collapsed. Nomadic herders such as the Amorites moved herds closer to reliable water suppliers, bringing them into conflict with Akkadian populations. This climate-induced collapse seems to have affected the whole of the Middle East, and to have coincided with the collapse of the Egyptian Old Kingdom.

This collapse of rain-fed agriculture in the Upper Country meant the loss to southern Mesopotamia of the agrarian subsidies which had kept the Akkadian Empire solvent. Water levels within the Tigris and Euphrates fell 1.5 meters beneath the level of 2600 BC, and although they stabilized for a time during the following Ur III period, rivalries between pastoralists and farmers increased. Attempts were undertaken to prevent the former from herding their flocks in agricultural lands, such as the building of a  wall known as the "Repeller of the Amorites" between the Tigris and Euphrates under the Ur III ruler Shu-Sin. Such attempts led to increased political instability; meanwhile, severe depression occurred to re-establish demographic equilibrium with the less favorable climatic conditions.

Richard Zettler has critiqued the drought theory, observing that the chronology of the Akkadian empire is very uncertain and that available evidence is not sufficient to show its economic dependence on the northern areas excavated by Weiss and others. He also criticizes Weiss for taking Akkadian writings literally to describe certain catastrophic events.

According to Joan Oates, at Tell Brak, the soil "signal" associated with the drought lies below the level of Naram-Sin's palace. However, evidence
may suggest a tightening of Akkadian control following the Brak 'event', for example, the construction of the heavily fortified 'palace' itself and the apparent introduction of greater numbers of Akkadian as opposed to local officials, perhaps a reflection of unrest in the countryside of the type that often follows some natural catastrophe. Furthermore, Brak remained occupied and functional after the fall of the Akkadians.

In 2019, a study by Hokkaido University on fossil corals in Oman provides an evidence that prolonged winter shamal seasons led to the salinization of the irrigated fields; hence, a dramatic decrease in crop production triggered a widespread famine and eventually the collapse of the ancient Akkadian Empire.

Government

The Akkadian government formed a "classical standard" with which all future Mesopotamian states compared themselves. Traditionally, the ensi was the highest functionary of the Sumerian city-states. In later traditions, one became an ensi by marrying the goddess Inanna, legitimising the rulership through divine consent.

Initially, the monarchical lugal (lu = man, gal =Great) was subordinate to the priestly ensi, and was appointed at times of troubles, but by later dynastic times, it was the lugal who had emerged as the preeminent role, having his own "é" (= house) or "palace", independent from the temple establishment. By the time of Mesalim, whichever dynasty controlled the city of Kish was recognised as šar kiššati (= king of Kish), and was considered preeminent in Sumer, possibly because this was where the two rivers approached, and whoever controlled Kish ultimately controlled the irrigation systems of the other cities downstream.

As Sargon extended his conquest from the "Lower Sea" (Persian Gulf), to the "Upper Sea" (Mediterranean), it was felt that he ruled "the totality of the lands under heaven", or "from sunrise to sunset", as contemporary texts put it. Under Sargon, the ensis generally retained their positions, but were seen more as provincial governors. The title šar kiššati became recognised as meaning "lord of the universe". Sargon is even recorded as having organised naval expeditions to Dilmun (Bahrain) and Magan, amongst the first organised military naval expeditions in history. Whether he also did in the case of the Mediterranean with the kingdom of Kaptara (possibly Cyprus), as claimed in later documents, is more questionable.

With Naram-Sin, Sargon's grandson, this went further than with Sargon, with the king not only being called "Lord of the Four-Quarters (of the Earth)", but also elevated to the ranks of the dingir (= gods), with his own temple establishment. Previously a ruler could, like Gilgamesh, become divine after death but the Akkadian kings, from Naram-Sin onward, were considered gods on earth in their lifetimes. Their portraits showed them of larger size than mere mortals and at some distance from their retainers.

One strategy adopted by both Sargon and Naram-Sin, to maintain control of the country, was to install their daughters, Enheduanna and Emmenanna respectively, as high priestess to Sin, the Akkadian version of the Sumerian moon deity, Nanna, at Ur, in the extreme south of Sumer; to install sons as provincial ensi governors in strategic locations; and to marry their daughters to rulers of peripheral parts of the Empire (Urkesh and Marhashe). A well documented case of the latter is that of Naram-Sin's daughter Tar'am-Agade at Urkesh.

Records at the Brak administrative complex suggest that the Akkadians appointed locals as tax collectors.

Economy

The population of Akkad, like nearly all pre-modern states, was entirely dependent upon the agricultural systems of the region, which seem to have had two principal centres: the irrigated farmlands of southern Iraq that traditionally had a yield of 30 grains returned for each grain sown and the rain-fed agriculture of northern Iraq, known as the "Upper Country."

Before the Akkadian period, the progressive salinisation of the soils, produced by poorly drained irrigation, had been reducing yields of wheat in the southern part of the country, leading to the conversion to more salt-tolerant barley growing. Urban populations there had peaked already by 2,600 BC, and demographic pressures were high, contributing to the rise of militarism apparent immediately before the Akkadian period (as seen in the Stele of the Vultures of Eannatum). Warfare between city states had led to a population decline, from which Akkad provided a temporary respite. It was this high degree of agricultural productivity in the south that enabled the growth of the highest population densities in the world at this time, giving Akkad its military advantage.

The water table in this region was very high and replenished regularly—by winter storms in the headwaters of the Tigris and Euphrates from October to March and from snow-melt from March to July. Flood levels, that had been stable from about 3,000 to 2,600 BC, had started falling, and by the Akkadian period were a half-meter to a meter lower than recorded previously. Even so, the flat country and weather uncertainties made flooding much more unpredictable than in the case of the Nile; serious deluges seem to have been a regular occurrence, requiring constant maintenance of irrigation ditches and drainage systems. Farmers were recruited into regiments for this work from August to October—a period of food shortage—under the control of city temple authorities, thus acting as a form of unemployment relief. Gwendolyn Leick has suggested that this was Sargon's original employment for the king of Kish, giving him experience in effectively organising large groups of men; a tablet reads, "Sargon, the king, to whom Enlil permitted no rival—5,400 warriors ate bread daily before him".

Harvest was in the late spring and during the dry summer months. Nomadic Amorites from the northwest would pasture their flocks of sheep and goats to graze on the crop residue and be watered from the river and irrigation canals. For this privilege, they would have to pay a tax in wool, meat, milk, and cheese to the temples, who would distribute these products to the bureaucracy and priesthood. In good years, all would go well, but in bad years, wild winter pastures would be in short supply, nomads would seek to pasture their flocks in the grain fields, and conflicts with farmers would result. It would appear that the subsidizing of southern populations by the import of wheat from the north of the Empire temporarily overcame this problem, and it seems to have allowed economic recovery and a growing population within this region.

Foreign trade

As a result, Sumer and Akkad had a surplus of agricultural products but was short of almost everything else, particularly metal ores, timber and building stone, all of which had to be imported. The spread of the Akkadian state as far as the "silver mountain" (possibly the Taurus Mountains), the "cedars" of Lebanon, and the copper deposits of Magan, was largely motivated by the goal of securing control over these imports. One tablet reads:

International trade developed during the Akkadian period. Indus-Mesopotamia relations also seem to have expanded: Sargon of Akkad (circa 2300 or 2250 BC), was the first Mesopotamian ruler to make an explicit reference to the region of Meluhha, which is generally understood as being the Baluchistan or the Indus area.

Culture

Akkadian art

In art, there was a great emphasis on the kings of the dynasty, alongside much that continued earlier Sumerian art. Little architecture remains. In large works and small ones such as seals, the degree of realism was considerably increased, but the seals show a "grim world of cruel conflict, of danger and uncertainty, a world in which man is subjected without appeal to the incomprehensible acts of distant and fearful divinities who he must serve but cannot love. This sombre mood ... remained characteristic of Mesopotamian art..."

Akkadian sculpture is remarkable for its fineness and realism, which shows a clear advancement compared to the previous period of Sumerian art.

Seals
The Akkadians used visual arts as a vehicle of ideology. They developed a new style for cylinder seals by reusing traditional animal decorations but organizing them around inscriptions, which often became central parts of the layout. The figures also became more sculptural and naturalistic. New elements were also included, especially in relation to the rich Akkadian mythology.

Language

During the 3rd millennium BC, there developed a very intimate cultural symbiosis between the Sumerians and the Akkadians, which included widespread bilingualism. The influence of Sumerian on Akkadian (and vice versa) is evident in all areas, from lexical borrowing on a massive scale, to syntactic, morphological, and phonological convergence. This has prompted scholars to refer to Sumerian and Akkadian in the third millennium as a sprachbund.

Akkadian gradually replaced Sumerian as a spoken language somewhere around 2000 BC (the exact dating being a matter of debate), but Sumerian continued to be used as a sacred, ceremonial, literary, and scientific language in Mesopotamia until the 1st century AD.

Poet–priestess Enheduanna

Sumerian literature continued in rich development during the Akkadian period. Enheduanna, the "wife (Sumerian dam = high priestess) of Nanna [the Sumerian moon god] and daughter of Sargon" of the temple of Sin at Ur, who lived –2250 BC, is the first poet in history whose name is known. Her known works include hymns to the goddess Inanna, the Exaltation of Inanna and In-nin sa-gur-ra. A third work, the Temple Hymns, a collection of specific hymns, addresses the sacred temples and their occupants, the deity to whom they were consecrated. The works of this poet are significant, because although they start out using the third person, they shift to the first person voice of the poet herself, and they mark a significant development in the use of cuneiform. As poet, princess, and priestess, she was a person who, according to William W. Hallo, "set standards in all three of her roles for many succeeding centuries"

In the Exultation of Inanna,

Curse of Akkad

Later material described how the fall of Akkad was due to Naram-Sin's attack upon the city of Nippur. When prompted by a pair of inauspicious oracles, the king sacked the E-kur temple, supposedly protected by the god Enlil, head of the pantheon. As a result of this, eight chief deities of the Anunnaki pantheon were supposed to have come together and withdrawn their support from Akkad.

For the first time since cities were built and founded,
The great agricultural tracts produced no grain,
The inundated tracts produced no fish,
The irrigated orchards produced neither syrup nor wine,
The gathered clouds did not rain, the masgurum did not grow.
At that time, one shekel's worth of oil was only one-half quart,
One shekel's worth of grain was only one-half quart. . . .
These sold at such prices in the markets of all the cities!
He who slept on the roof, died on the roof,
He who slept in the house, had no burial,
People were flailing at themselves from hunger.

The kings of Akkad were legendary among later Mesopotamian civilizations, with Sargon understood as the prototype of a strong and wise leader, and his grandson Naram-Sin considered the wicked and impious leader (Unheilsherrscher in the analysis of Hans Gustav Güterbock) who brought ruin upon his kingdom.

Technology
 A tablet from the periods reads, "(From the earliest days) no-one had made a statue of lead, (but) Rimush king of Kish, had a statue of himself made of lead. It stood before Enlil; and it recited his (Rimush's) virtues to the idu of the gods". The copper Bassetki Statue, cast with the lost wax method, testifies to the high level of skill that craftsmen achieved during the Akkadian period.

See also

 List of cities of the ancient Near East
 Religions of the ancient Near East
 History of Mesopotamia

Notes

Bibliography 

 Liverani, Mario, ed. (1993). Akkad: The First World Empire: Structure, Ideology Traditions. Padova: Sargon srl. 
 Oates, Joan (2004). "Archaeology in Mesopotamia: Digging Deeper at Tell Brak". 2004 Albert Reckitt Archaeological Lecture. In Proceedings of the British Academy: 2004 Lectures; Oxford University Press, 2005. .
 Paszke, Marcin Z, "From Sargon To Narām-Sîn: some remarks on Akkadian military activity in the II nd half of the III rd millennium bc. The example of eastern campaigns", Acta Archaeologica Lodziensia 68, pp. 75-83, 2022
 
 E. A. Speiser, Some Factors in the Collapse of Akkad, Journal of the American Oriental Society, vol. 72, no. 3, pp. 97–101, (Jul. - Sep. 1952)
 
Gough, M.A, Historical Perception in the Sargonic Literary Tradition. The Implication of Copied Texts, Rosetta 1, pp 1–9, 2006
Douglas R. Frayne, The Sargonic and Gutian Periods (2334-2113), University of Toronto Press, 1993,

External links

 Iraq's Ancient Past – Penn Museum
 Year Names of Narim-Sin – CDLI
 Year Named of Shar-kali-Sharri – CDLI
 Site on Enheduanna at Virginia Tech University (archived 12 December 2009)

 
States and territories established in the 3rd millennium BC
States and territories disestablished in the 3rd millennium BC
Assyrian geography
Ancient Mesopotamia
Ancient Upper Mesopotamia
Ancient Levant
24th-century BC establishments
3rd-millennium BC disestablishments
Former monarchies of Asia
Nimrod
Former empires